Koreana may refer to:

 Koreana (band), a South Korean band
Koreana (TV series), a Filipino drama series produced by GMA Network
Koreana Hotel (Seoul), a skyscraper and hotel in Seoul
 Koreana (magazine), a cultural quarterly magazine

See also 
 Tripitaka Koreana, a Korean collection of the Tripitaka (Buddhist scriptures) carved in the 13th century